A Collection is a six compact disc box set by the Doors, released by Elektra and Rhino Records on July 5, 2011.

This collection packages the complete anthology of the Doors albums before Jim Morrison's death in 1971. It features the 40th anniversary versions of the tracks, remastered by Bruce Botnick, and original artwork in replicated paper sleeves. The bonus tracks that are included in the individual 40th anniversary versions are not included in this boxset. The albums are placed in chronological order.

Albums
All studio albums with Jim Morrison currently available in the box set were released on Elektra Records.

 The Doors (1967)
 Strange Days (1967)
 Waiting for the Sun (1968)
 The Soft Parade (1969)
 Morrison Hotel (1970)
 L.A. Woman (1971)

Charts and certifications

Charts

Certifications

Personnel
The Doors
Jim Morrison – lead vocals
Ray Manzarek – piano, organ, keyboards & bass
Robby Krieger – guitar
John Densmore – drums

Additional musicians
Larry Knechtel (uncredited) – bass guitar on tracks 2, 4, 6-8, & 10 of The Doors
Douglass Lubahn – bass guitar on tracks 1–3, 6–9 (of Strange Days), 1-5, 7, 9-11 (of Waiting for the Sun), 5-6, & 8 (of The Soft Parade)
Kerry Magness – bass guitar on track 6 of Waiting for the Sun
Leroy Vinnegar – acoustic bass on track 7 of Waiting for the Sun
Curtis Amy – saxophone solo on track 2 of The Soft Parade
Reinol Andino – conga on "The Soft Parade"
George Bohanan – trombone on tracks 1, 2, 7, and 8 of The Soft Parade
Harvey Brooks – bass guitar on tracks 1 to 4, 7 and 9 of The Soft Parade
Jimmy Buchanan – fiddle on track 7 of The Soft Parade
Jesse McReynolds – mandolin on track 2 of The Soft Parade
Champ Webb – English horn solo on track 8 of The Soft Parade
Paul Harris – orchestral arrangements on tracks 1, 2, 7, and 8 of The Soft Parade
Lonnie Mack – bass guitar on tracks 1 and 11 of Morrison Hotel
Ray Neapolitan – bass guitar on tracks 2 to 9 of Morrison Hotel
John Sebastian (credited as "G. Puglese") – harmonica on track 1 of Morrison Hotel
Jerry Scheff – bass guitar on L.A. Woman
Marc Benno – additional guitar on "L.A. Woman"

Technical
Paul A. Rothchild – producer of all albums except L.A. Woman
Bruce Botnick – co-producer of L.A. Woman; engineer for all the albums included

References

Albums produced by Paul A. Rothchild
Albums produced by Bruce Botnick
The Doors compilation albums
2011 compilation albums
Elektra Records compilation albums
Rhino Records compilation albums